The 2006–07 Ukrainian First League is the sixteenth since its establishment. There were 20 teams competing. Two teams were relegated from the Ukrainian Premier League 2005-06. Four teams were promoted from the 2005–06 Ukrainian Second League.

Promotion and relegation

Promoted teams 
These four teams were promoted from Druha Liha at the start of the season:

Group A 
 FC Desna Chernihiv : Druha Liha champion (Returning after seven seasons)

Group B 
 MFK Mykolaiv : Druha Liha champion (Returning after a seasons)
 PFC Olexandria : Druha Liha runner-up (Returning after five seasons)

Group C 
 FC Dnipro Cherkasy : Druha Liha champion (Returning after five seasons)

Relegated teams 
Two teams were relegated from the Ukrainian Premier League 2005–06 season after finishing on the bottom of the competition:
 FC Volyn Lutsk : 15th place (Returning after four seasons)
 FC Zakarpattia Uzhhorod : 16th place (Returning after two seasons)

Renamed/relocated teams 
 On May 23, 2006, the PFL Bureau of Ukraine acknowledged that FC Lviv will replace FC Hazovyk-Skala Stryi as its successor. The club was moved from Stryi to Lviv.
 On December 19, 2006 FC Dynamo-Ihroservis Simferopol changed to FC Ihroservis Simferopol.

Teams 
In 2006–07 season, the Ukrainian First League consists of the following teams:

Managers

Final standings 
{{#invoke:sports table|main|style=WDL
|res_col_header=PR

|team1=NAF|name_NAF=Naftovyk-Ukrnafta Okhtyrka
|team2=ZAK|name_ZAK=Zakarpattia Uzhhorod
|team3=OBK|name_OBK=Obolon Kyiv
|team4=KRM|name_KRM=Krymteplitsia Molodizhne
|team5=OLE|name_OLE=Olexandria
|team6=DK2|name_DK2=Dynamo-2 Kyiv
|team7=HEL|name_HEL=Helios Kharkiv
|team8=EBU|name_EBU=Enerhetyk Burshtyn
|team9=STD|name_STD=Stal Dniprodzerzhynsk
|team10=IHS|name_IHS=Ihroservice Simferopol
|team11=LVI|name_LVI=FC Lviv
|team12=VOL|name_VOL=Volyn Lutsk
|team13=MYK|name_MYK=MFK Mykolaiv
|team14=DES|name_DES=Desna Chernihiv
|team15=DNC|name_DNC=Dnipro Cherkasy
|team16=CSCA|name_CSCA=CSKA Kyiv
|team17=SIF|name_SIF=Spartak Ivano-Frankivsk|status_SIF=D
|team18=POD|name_POD=Podillya Khmelnytskyi|status_POD=D
|team19=BOR|name_BOR=Borysfen Boryspil|status_BOR=D
|team20=SUM|pos_SUM=–|name_SUM=Spartak Sumy |status_SUM=D
|win_NAF=27|draw_NAF=2|loss_NAF=7|gf_NAF=58|ga_NAF=29|status_NAF=C,P
|win_ZAK=25|draw_ZAK=5|loss_ZAK=6|gf_ZAK=50|ga_ZAK=22|status_ZAK=P
|win_OBK=23|draw_OBK=4|loss_OBK=9|gf_OBK=47|ga_OBK=27
|win_KRM=21|draw_KRM=7|loss_KRM=8|gf_KRM=53|ga_KRM=37
|win_OLE=18|draw_OLE=4|loss_OLE=13|gf_OLE=37|ga_OLE=27
|win_DK2=17|draw_DK2=8|loss_DK2=11|gf_DK2=53|ga_DK2=37
|win_HEL=17|draw_HEL=7|loss_HEL=12|gf_HEL=45|ga_HEL=36
|win_EBU=15|draw_EBU=11|loss_EBU=10|gf_EBU=44|ga_EBU=33
|win_STD=15|draw_STD=8|loss_STD=13|gf_STD=42|ga_STD=37
|win_IHS=14|draw_IHS=9|loss_IHS=13|gf_IHS=46|ga_IHS=44
|win_LVI=13|draw_LVI=8|loss_LVI=15|gf_LVI=45|ga_LVI=45
|win_VOL=13|draw_VOL=7|loss_VOL=16|gf_VOL=40|ga_VOL=48
|win_MYK=12|draw_MYK=10|loss_MYK=14|gf_MYK=33|ga_MYK=40
|win_DES=11|draw_DES=8|loss_DES=17|gf_DES=51|ga_DES=58
|win_DNC=10|draw_DNC=9|loss_DNC=17|gf_DNC=31|ga_DNC=46
|win_CSCA=10|draw_CSCA=8|loss_CSCA=18|gf_CSCA=24|ga_CSCA=44
|win_SIF=10|draw_SIF=3|loss_SIF=23|gf_SIF=24|ga_SIF=51
|win_POD=5|draw_POD=6|loss_POD=25|gf_POD=20|ga_POD=63|adjust_points_POD=-12|note_POD=Podillia Khmelnytskyi had taken 3 points off in accordance with decision of the FFU Disciplinary Committee of May 25, 2007; 3 points off in accordance with decision of the PFL Bureau of Ukraine of June 5, 2007; and 6 points off in accordance with decision of the FFU Appellation Committee of June 22, 2007.
|win_BOR=1|draw_BOR=4|loss_BOR=31|gf_BOR=10|ga_BOR=29|adjust_points_BOR=-6|note_BOR=Borysfen Boryspil had taken 6 points off in accordance with decision of the PFL Bureau of Ukraine of February 6, 2007.
|win_SUM=1|draw_SUM=0|loss_SUM=18|gf_SUM=4|ga_SUM=49
|col_PC=green1|text_PC=Promoted to Vyshcha Liha
|result1=PC|result2=PC
|col_NP=inherit|text_NP=No promotion
|result6=NP
|col_WD=black1|text_WD=Withdrew
|result17=WD|result18=WD|result20=WD
|col_EX=black1|text_EX=Excluded
|result19=EX
|update=complete|source=Professional Football League of Ukraine
|class_rules=1st points; 2nd goal difference; 3rd goals scored; 4th head-to-head points; 5th head-to-head goal difference; 6th head-to-head goals scored; 7th fair play; 8th draw
}}

 Top scorers 
Statistics are taken from here.

 Teams withdrawn during and after season 

 Spartak Sumy 
On November 28, 2006 PFL Bureau has excluded FC Spartak Sumy from competitions for the second no show. Due to the fact that team has physically played less than 50% of calendar games (17 games), all its season record was stripped. Upon withdrawal it had 1-0-18 record and 4-49 goals difference.

 Borysfen Boryspil 
On March 16, 2007 FC Borysfen Boryspil was excluded from competitions for systematic violation of statute and regulations of FFU and PFL, failure to comply with their organs of administration and implementation football justice as well as failure to fulfill terms of contracts with players and financial obligations to FFU and PFL. In the rest of games were nominated technical losses to the team and its opponents - technical victory.

 Podillia Khmelnytskyi 
In the second half of the season Podillia Khmelnytskyi moved from Khmelnytskyi to Krasyliv. At the same time for the amateur championship registered a new club from Khmelnytskyi, FC Podillia-Khmelnytskyi Khmelnytskyi''. So, since spring 2007 there were two clubs Podillia, one at professional level playing in Krasyliv and other - amateur playing in Khmelnytskyi. One of the reasons was the prior merger of Podillia with FC Krasyliv back in 2004. At the end of 2006–07 season Podillia Krasyliv changed back to FC Krasyliv and was scheduled to play in the 2007-08 Ukrainian Second League, but withdrew just before the start of season.

Instead of Krasyliv to the Ukrainian Second League applied the newly revived FC Podillia-Khmelnytskyi Khmelnytskyi. In such manner there was created a club's continium.

Spartak Ivano-Frankivsk 
FC Spartak Ivano-Frankivsk was relegated to the Ukrainian Second League, while another team form local university FC Fakel Ivano-Frankivsk obtain promotion to the Ukrainian First League. The city municipality on whose balance ended up both clubs decided to keep one and dissolve another one. So, in the 2007-08 Ukrainian Second League season there were no clubs playing from Ivano-Frankivsk, while a new team FSC Prykarpattia Ivano-Frankivsk was created in place of Fakel to participate in the 2007-08 Ukrainian First League season.

See also 
 2006–07 Ukrainian Premier League
 2006–07 Ukrainian Second League
 2006–07 Ukrainian Cup

References

External links 
  Persha Liha at Official Site of the Professional Football league of Ukraine
 38th round of season and final league table - UA-Football.com 

Ukrainian First League seasons
2006–07 in Ukrainian association football leagues
Ukra